Adrian C. Wilcox High School is a public school located in Santa Clara, California. It is one of two high schools serving those living within the boundaries of the Santa Clara Unified School District. (Previously there were four high schools in the district.  See below.)  The school is named after Adrian C. Wilcox, who served on the Santa Clara Union High School Board of Trustees for over 30 years. Wilcox was first accredited by the Western Association of Schools and Colleges in 1966 and is accredited through 2009. In April 2005, Wilcox officially became a California Distinguished School.

History
Construction of the school began in the late 1950s. The school was named for the ranking member of the Santa Clara Union High School Board of Trustees, Adrian C. Wilcox. The school opened its doors in the fall of 1961 to what became its first graduating class, the class of 1964, which entered as sophomores. The first graduating class to attend Wilcox for all four years was the Class of 1965.

The student body was split when Marian A. Peterson High School opened in the district and then later recombined when Peterson and Buchser High School's name was converted  into middle schools. At that time, the student body voted to change the name of the mascot, newspaper, and yearbook, along with the school colors, to be more inclusive of the new students. The original mascot for Wilcox was The Warrior, the school colors were Green and Gold, the newspaper was The War Chants, and the yearbook was The Promethean. The original school song (All Hail Our Alma Mater) and fight song (Fight On Wilcox) are still in use today.

In February 2005, the Mission City Center for the Performing Arts, a building constructed adjacent to the school and across Calabazas Creek from the main campus, opened.

Student life

The school year typically begins in late August, consists of 180 school days, and usually ends on the second Friday of June.

The school newspaper is known as The Scribe and usually publishes seven issues per year.

The school yearbook is known as The Phoenix.

Extracurricular groups include a marching band (known as the Black and Gold Regime), orchestra, drill team (Chargerettes), cheerleaders (Spirit Squad), a theater troupe (Wilcox Stage Company), Color guard, a dance team, a debate team, and a choir.
They also have a winterguard, which is solo colorguard, and a winter percussion program. There are also many sports teams that students can join on campus, including soccer, basketball, and football.

Each class is also designated a class color. The current colors are:

The colors are mainly used for the annual battle of the classes, known as Fantastics. Fantastics was formed as a spirit activity first held in 1995. The event takes place in March, and all the classes compete against each other in various physical contests (such as a tug of war). There is also a multitude of dances that each grade performs - opening dance, boys dance, girls dance, couples dance, advanced dance, and the finale dance. The competitors wear shirts with the color of their class.

The colors are on a four-year rotation, with the color of the graduating seniors being handed off to the upcoming year's freshmen (i.e. after the class of 2015 graduates this year, the incoming freshman of the 2015–2016 school year, or the class of 2019, will receive their class color of blue).

Yellow and Blue are Sister Classes and Red and Green are Sister Classes.

Homecoming and Fantastics are all organized by ASB and the four class councils. ASB is composed of 17 students (13 officers and 4 class presidents). They are in charge of dances, rallies, and school-wide events. Every March, students run to be on ASB.

A lower level of ASB consists of the four class councils. Each class council has nine members, with the class president also being part of ASB. Much like ASB, students must run for election to class councils. A class council candidate speaks in front of the class. Most students who are on ASB started as a class council member. Class councils are in charge of class funds, class fundraisers, activities, and Fantastics and Homecoming execution.

Music

The music department includes male and female glee clubs, choir, chamber choir, marching band, dance band, pep band, concert band, and orchestra.

The instrumental programs listed in the 2015–2016 course catalog are band, jazz band, and string orchestra. Vocal offerings are chorus and canta nova.

The Wilcox High School Marching band, the "Black and Gold Regime", is a competitive after school-program. Competitions include the Cupertino Tournament of Bands, Foothill High School Band Review, The Lodi Grape Bowl Classic, WBA Independence High School Field Show, and the Fairfield High School Tournament of Champions.

During football/fall season, the concert band class performs at home games as the pep band, along with the color guard and BGR members not in concert band. The BGR performs their show at halftime for most of the back half of the season.

During the winter season, the department offers after school Winter Percussion and Winter guard. These programs are generally smaller than the fall season's, but rehearse just as often and also perform at competitions.

The 3 concerts put on by the Wilcox music program are the Winter Concert, the Spring Concert, and the Pops Concert. The Orchestra, Jazz band, Concert band and Marching band/Winter Perc Ensemble perform in the Mission City center for Performing Arts' theater. Admission to these concerts has always been free and open to the public.

Athletics

Wilcox competes in the Santa Clara Valley Athletic League, a league that is split into two divisions: De Anza and El Camino.

Sports offered at Wilcox include:
Fall: football, cross country, girls' volleyball, field hockey, girls' tennis, water polo, girls' golf, girls' field hockey
Winter: basketball, wrestling, soccer
Spring: track and field, baseball, softball, swimming and diving, boys' volleyball, boys' golf, badminton, boys' tennis, lacrosse

Baseball
Wilcox's baseball program has won five CCS titles in the past 14 years (2000, 2002, 2004,2008, 2014). Wilcox baseball has had numerous athletes compete at the collegiate and professional level, including Carney Lansford.

Track and Field

From 2009 to 2015, The Varsity Boys Track and Field Team remained undefeated in league competition. During the same time period The Varsity Girls Track Team was undefeated for a period of four years. During  this time period, 2009–2015 the combined varsity boys and girls track teams had an overall win loss record of 84–4 with the boys at 42–0. In 2008–2009 the Wilcox Track and Field Team made history, both the girls and boys team went undefeated in their League for the first time.

During the years 2009–2016 the track and field program at Wilcox HS produced:

12 CCS champions, 5 second-place finishers, 8 third place, 4 fourth place

26 state championship qualifiers, 7 state finalists, 4 state medalists

The Wilcox track and field program has had two Olympic athletes. 1999 Wilcox graduate Amin Nikfar, represented the Republic of Iran in the men's shot put in the 2008 and 2012 Olympic Games.  Former head coach and long-time science teacher, Mike Buncic, represented the United States in the men's discus yhrow in the 1988 and 1992 Olympic Games

Other Wilcox athletic programs
In the 2008–2009, the girls' water polo team had their first ever perfect regular season before losing in CCS. In 2007, Wilcox's badminton team came third overall in their league.  The Wilcox wrestling team went undefeated in the El Camino League in 2007–2008 season, winning the league championship. In 2008–2009 the Wilcox football team made it to the C.C.S finals against Menlo Atherton. In the 2009–2010 season, Wilcox played against Los Gatos in the CCS finals and lost by 1 point in overtime.  In 1995 and 1997, the Wilcox football team had its best seasons with winning 2 CCS Division II championships. The boys volleyball program at Wilcox earned a berth into the 2014 CCS Division 1 Playoffs for the first time in school history after winning the SCVAL-El Camino Division title.

Notable alumni
 Carney Lansford, Class of 1975, 15-year Major League Baseball veteran (1978–1992). The baseball field at Wilcox is named after him.
 Carlos Noriega, Class of 1977, NASA astronaut, retired lieutenant colonel in the United States Marine Corps.
 John H. Hendy, Class of 1981, American football player for the San Diego Chargers, 1985–1987. Voted first-team NFL All-Rookie at cornerback, 1985.
 Juju Chang, Class of 1983, journalist and broadcaster for ABC News.
 Robert Royston, Class of 1988, dancer, choreographer, US Open Swing Dance Championship and World Country Dance Championship four consecutive years (1995 to 1998)
 Craig Dietrich, Class of 1998, Director of the Digital Humanities Studio program at the Claremont Colleges, noted for his work developing software for cultural heritage.
 Amin Abraham Paul Nikfar, Class of 1999, shot putter who represented Iran, in the 2008 and 2012 Summer Olympic Games and was the Asian Indoor Champion in 2004.
 Kyle Barraclough, Class of 2008, relief pitcher for the Minnesota Twins of Major League Baseball.

References

Educational institutions established in 1961
High schools in Santa Clara County, California
Education in Santa Clara, California
Public high schools in California
1961 establishments in California